Xavier Moon (born January 2, 1995) is an American professional basketball player for the Los Angeles Clippers of the National Basketball Association (NBA), on a two-way contract with the Ontario Clippers of the NBA G League.  Moon won CEBL Player of the Year three years in a row from 2019 to 2021 while playing for the Edmonton Stingers. He played college basketball for Northwest Florida State and Morehead State. He is the nephew of former NBA basketball player Jamario Moon.

High school career
Moon grew up in Goodwater, Alabama and began playing organized basketball in seventh grade. He attended Central Coosa High School where he played on the junior varsity team as a freshman before playing three years on varsity. As a senior, he led Alabama in scoring with 35 points per game. In the tournament semifinal, he scored 48 points, followed by 50 points in the championship game. Moon earned Alabama Sports Writers Association All-State team honors and went to the Alabama-Mississippi All-Star game. Moon also played on the football team as a senior as a quarterback. He was lightly recruited, as Itawamba Community College was the first school to offer him a scholarship during his senior season, and Moon ended up signing with Northwest Florida State College.

College career
Moon attended Northwest Florida State College for two years. As a freshman, he averaged 4.5 points per game. He averaged 7.7 points per game as a sophomore. Moon was named Sixth Man of the Year as the Raiders finished 33-2 and won the National Junior College Championship. Moon transferred to Morehead State before his junior season, choosing the Eagles because it felt like home.

He finished second on the team in scoring as a junior at 10.2 points per game and shot 48 percent from the field. Moon recorded the first triple-double in Morehead State history on December 19, 2016, notching 25 points, 11 assists and 10 rebounds against Central Arkansas. He scored a career-high 26 points against Austin Peay on January 19, 2017. As a senior, Moon led Morehead State in scoring with 16.0 points per game and also averaged 4.6 assists and 3.5 rebounds per game. He was named to the First Team All-Ohio Valley Conference. Moon graduated from Morehead State in May 2017 with a bachelor's degree in Exercise Science.

Professional career

ALM Évreux (2017–2018)
On August 10, 2017, Moon signed his first professional contract with ALM Évreux Basket of the LNB Pro B. After six months, Moon left the team due to issues with the coach and returned home to Alabama.

Albany Patroons (2018)
His uncle Jamario Moon suggested that he join his team, the Albany Patroons, and Xavier did so after coach Derrick Rowland was impressed with his play. In the Patroon locker room, Xavier became known as "half Moon", in contrast with his uncle, known as "full Moon". Xavier averaged 18 points, 8 rebounds and 6 assists per game and was named North American Premier Basketball rookie of the year.

London Lightning (2018–2019)
Moon signed with London Lightning of the National Basketball League of Canada on September 7, 2018. He averaged 13.7 points, 4.9 rebounds and 4.1 assists per game in 40 games.

Edmonton Stingers (2019–2020)
Alex Johnson informed Moon of the formation of the Canadian Elite Basketball League, and he joined the Edmonton Stingers. In his first game on May 11, 2019, he scored 36 points in a 118–105 overtime victory against the Niagara River Lions. Moon averaged 19.3 points and 5.7 assists per game for Edmonton and was named league MVP. He led the team to the semifinals before losing to the eventual champions Saskatchewan Rattlers. Following the season, Moon tried out for Raptors 905 of the NBA G League but was one of the final roster cuts.

Return to the Lightning (2019–2020)
He re-signed with the Lightning on November 15. On January 4, 2020, he scored 39 points in a 113–97 victory over the KW Titans. Moon averaged 21.5 points, 6.5 rebounds and 5.3 assists per game during the shortened 2019–20 season and was named to the First Team All-NBL Canada.

On June 25, 2020, Moon signed with Wilki Morskie Szczecin of the Polish Basketball League.

Return to the Stingers (2020)
Moon re-joined the Edmonton Stingers for the 2020 CEBL season. He scored 31 points in the championship game, a 90–73 win against the Fraser Valley Bandits, and was named the Final MVP. He also won his second Most Valuable Player award. Moon averaged 19.5 points, 4.5 assists, 4 rebounds and 1.8 steals per game.

Maccabi Hod HaSharon (2020–2021)
In August 2020 Moon signed with Maccabi Hod HaSharon of the Israeli National League. During his 31 games in the league he averaged 24.5 points, 6.8 rebounds, and 4.4 assists per game.

Third stint with the Stingers (2020–2021)
After the season overseas, Xavier returned to the Edmonton Stingers of the CEBL for the 2020-2021 season where he continued his MVP reign, winning his 3rd CEBL MVP award, his 2nd CEBL Championship, and his 2nd CEBL Finals MVP Award.

Los Angeles / Agua Caliente / Ontario Clippers (2021–present)
On October 27, 2021, Moon signed with the Agua Caliente Clippers. He averaged 12.4 points, 7.3 assists, 4.4 rebounds and 1.4 steals per game in 14 games in the G league.

On December 26, 2021, Moon signed a 10-day contract with the Los Angeles Clippers. Moon scored his first NBA points, and had his NBA debut on December 27, 2021 versus the Brooklyn Nets at Crypto.com Arena. On January 4, 2022, he signed a second 10-day contract with the Clippers and on January 14, they signed him to a third 10-day.

On January 24, 2022, Moon was reacquired and activated by Ontario and on March 26, he signed a two-way contract with the Los Angeles Clippers.

On November 3, 2022, Moon was named to the opening night roster for the Ontario Clippers.

On March 1, 2023, Moon signed a two-way contract with the Los Angeles Clippers.

Career statistics

NBA

|-
| style="text-align:left;"| 
| style="text-align:left;"| L.A. Clippers
| 10 || 0 || 13.7 || .490 || .357 || .600 || 1.4 || 2.4 || .7 || .3 || 5.8
|- class="sortbottom"
| style="text-align:center;" colspan="2"| Career
| 10 || 0 || 13.7 || .490 || .357 || .600 || 1.4 || 2.4 || .7 || .3 || 5.8

Personal life
Moon is the oldest of three children born to Michelle Moon. Michelle's brother Jamario played professional basketball in the NBA. Moon did not find out who his father, Brian Thomas, was until his junior year of high school. On April 20, 2016, his stepfather Elbert Wilson was murdered while mowing his lawn.

References

External links
Morehead State Eagles bio

1995 births
Living people
Agua Caliente Clippers players
ALM Évreux Basket players
American expatriate basketball people in Canada
American expatriate basketball people in France
American expatriate basketball people in Poland
American men's basketball players
Basketball players from Alabama
Edmonton Stingers players
London Lightning players
Los Angeles Clippers players
Morehead State Eagles men's basketball players
Northwest Florida State Raiders men's basketball players
People from Goodwater, Alabama
Shooting guards
Undrafted National Basketball Association players
United States men's national basketball team players